Fukuchiyama Sandan-ike Park Gymnasium is an arena in Fukuchiyama, Kyoto, Japan.

Facilities
Main arena 49m x 39m
Sub arena 31.93m x 22m
Conference room
Training room

References

Basketball venues in Japan
Indoor arenas in Japan
Kyoto Hannaryz
Sports venues in Kyoto Prefecture
Fukuchiyama, Kyoto